The 2016 6 Hours of Fuji was an endurance sports car racing event held at the Fuji Speedway, Oyama, Japan on 14–16 October 2016, and served as the seventh race of the 2016 FIA World Endurance Championship. Toyota's Stéphane Sarrazin, Mike Conway and Kamui Kobayashi won the race driving the No. 6 Toyota Gazoo Racing car.

Qualifying

Qualifying result
Pole position in Class is in bold.

Race

Race result
Class winners are denoted with bold.

Notes

References

2016
2016 in Japanese motorsport
Fuji
October 2016 sports events in Japan